Saphenista deliphrobursa is a species of moth of the family Tortricidae. It is found in Costa Rica.

The wingspan is about 8.5 mm. The ground colour of the forewings is pearl white with a glossy, pale ochreous-yellow pattern. The hindwings are greyish.

References

Moths described in 1992
Saphenista